La svergognata (The shameless woman), is a 1974 Italian erotic drama film directed by Giuliano Biagetti. It marked the film debut of Leonora Fani.

Plot  
Fabio is a writer in full creative crisis, married to Silvia, a beautiful actress for whom, however, he is no longer able to get excited. During a holiday with friends in Ischia, he meets the eighteen-year-old Ornella and a relationship slowly begins between the two.

Cast 
Philippe Leroy: Fabio Lorenzi
Leonora Fani: Ornella Bernardi
Barbara Bouchet: Silvia Lorenzi 
Pupo De Luca: Nino Bernardi
Maria Pia Conte: Giusy
Stefano Amato: Andrea
Dana Ghia: Clara

See also    
 List of Italian films of 1974

References

External links

La svergognata at Variety Distribution

1974 films
1974 drama films
1970s Italian-language films
Italian drama films
Films directed by Giuliano Biagetti
1970s Italian films